A koncerz is a type of sword used by Polish-Lithuanian hussars in the Renaissance period. It is a narrow and long thrusting sword, generally used by a type of heavy cavalry (husaria, the famed Polish hussars) and optimized to defeat body armor (either by piercing directly through mail links, or by thrusting between the plates of plate armor), but not used to cut or slash.

By the late 16th century it had increased in length to a typical  overall— blade—and had a more optimized weight distribution and balance. The koncerz was used more like a lance while on horseback; it provided a rider with a very long reach in a relatively compact format suitable for a sidearm (the typical primary weapon of hussars was a very long lance). As it was used primarily for thrusting, the koncerz often had no cutting edge, only a very sharp point; the blade itself was triangular or square in cross section in order to be more rigid.

The closest western European equivalent is the estoc, or "tuck".

References

External links
Polish Renaissance Warfare by S. A. Jasinski
Illustration of a Koncerz sword
Description of Koncerz
 Winged Hussars, Radoslaw Sikora, Bartosz Musialowicz, BUM Magazine, 2016.

Early Modern European swords
Renaissance-era weapons